Dodona is a location in Greece, known for its oracle.

Dodona may also refer to:
 Dodona (Thessaly), a city in ancient Thessaly, Greece
 Dodona (butterfly), a genus of butterflies in the family Riodinidae
 382 Dodona, an asteroid
 Dodona (see), a titular see of the Catholic Church
 Dodona Theatre, in Pristina, Kosovo
Dodona Manor, the historic home of George Marshall in Leesburg, Virginia, USA

See also
 Dodon (disambiguation)
 Dodone (disambiguation)